The Thompson-Voight dragster is a twin-engined streamliner dragster.

Mickey Thompson collaborated with Fritz Voight in building the dragster, which had a fully enclosed body (except the steel front wheels), including a closed canopy. It was powered by a pair of  Chrysler hemis, one facing forward to drive the rear wheels, the other facing backward to drive the front ones.

Wearing number 555, the car debuted in 1958 at Bonneville, after "an impromptu stop", where it achieved  on its very first run.

Notes

Sources
 Taylor, Thom.  "Beauty Beyond the Twilight Zone" in Hot Rod, April 2017, pp. 30–43.

1950s cars
Drag racing cars
Rear-wheel-drive vehicles